Sherwin Rosen (September 29, 1938 – March 17, 2001) was an American labor economist. He had ties with many American universities and academic institutions including the University of Chicago, the University of Rochester, Stanford University and its Hoover Institution. At the time of his death, Rosen was Edwin A. and Betty L. Bergman Distinguished Service Professor in Economics at the University of Chicago and president of the American Economic Association.

Rosen received his B.S. in economics from Purdue University in 1960, his M.A. and Ph.D. in economics from the University of Chicago in 1962 and 1966 respectively.

He was chair of the Economics department at the University of Chicago and colleague to an impressive range of celebrated economists including friend Gary S. Becker. He was elected to the National Academy of Sciences in 1997.

Rosen died at the Bernard Mitchell Hospital on March 17, 2001, at the age of 62.

Contributions to economics
As Palda wrote in 2013 
Rosen showed that tied sales could lead to the segregation of people by their types. He argued that the worst effects of segregation could be palliated by a market that resolved supply and demand of complicated tied sales situations through a monetary payment he called an “equalizing difference”. This work led to many unexpected insights on the effects of government policy. For example, the minimum wage might not decrease employment, as economists commonly believed, but it might induce employers to provide less on-the-job training to employees. In addition to implications for policy, Rosen's analysis of choice in characteristics space with tied sales specified the conditions under which the parameters of demand and supply function parameters for the underlying characteristics of goods could be deduced from so-called hedonic regressions.

Selected works

References

External links
 Obituary posted at the University of Chicago website.
 
 Lazear, Edward P. (2003). "Sherwin Rosen," Biographical Memoirs, Vol. 83 (National Academies Press, 2003), pp. 176–195. . Online versioni retrieved January 13, 2007.

1938 births
2001 deaths
American people of German descent
Labor economists
20th-century American economists
21st-century American economists
Purdue University alumni
University of Chicago alumni
University of Chicago faculty
Members of the United States National Academy of Sciences
Fellows of the Econometric Society
Presidents of the American Economic Association
Distinguished Fellows of the American Economic Association
Journal of Political Economy editors